Georgy Arturovich Popov (born 27 May 2001), is a Russian taekwondo athlete. He won the gold medal at the 2018 Youth Olympics on the Boys' 55 kg.

References 

Living people
Russian male taekwondo practitioners
Taekwondo practitioners at the 2018 Summer Youth Olympics
Youth Olympic gold medalists for Russia
2001 births
World Taekwondo Championships medalists
21st-century Russian people